Sharon Ann Chatman (December 15, 1947 – December 22, 2020) was an American college basketball coach, a lawyer, and a judge.

Chatman was the head coach at San Jose State from 1976 to 1986. Chatman subsequently change careers, graduated from law school, served as a deputy district attorney, and was a senior judge of the Superior Court of Santa Clara County, California, prior to her death.

Early life and education
Born in Texas, Chatman grew up in Bakersfield, California. After high school, Chatman attended Bakersfield College and transferred to California Polytechnic State University, where she played point guard for the Cal Poly Mustangs women's basketball team from 1968 to 1970 and graduated with a B.S. in physical education and later a master's degree. During her college basketball career, she twice achieved triple-doubles.

Coaching career
After graduating from Cal Poly, she was a physical education teacher and girls' basketball coach at Andrew P. Hill High School in San Jose from 1970 to 1973. For the 1973–74 school year, Chatman returned to Cal Poly as a women's basketball coach, where she had a 5–12 record.

From 1974 to 1976, Chatman was head women's basketball coach at De Anza College, a junior college in Cupertino, California.  In two seasons, her De Anza Dons teams compiled a win-loss record of 61–3.

Chatman was head coach at San Jose State from 1976 to 1986.  She is the only coach in the history of the Spartans basketball team to compile a winning record; her ten-season overall win-loss record was 143-121, with a conference win-loss record of 60–54.  For six consecutive seasons under Chatman, the Spartans had a winning record.  They won 24 and 22 games in 1979 and 1980, respectively, and won the NorCal Conference championship both years.  Chatman is the only women's basketball coach to lead the Spartans in post-season tournament play, coaching them to four consecutive AIAW tournament berths from 1978, 1979, 1980 and 1981.

In recognition of the achievements of her Spartans teams, she was honored as the San Jose State University Women's Basketball Coach of the Century, and she was inducted into the SJSU Sports Hall of Fame in 2004.

Legal career
Chatman changed careers in 1986, retired from coaching, and attended the University of California, Hastings College of Law at the age of 38.  After graduating from Hastings in 1989, she accepted a position as a deputy prosecutor in the Santa Clara County District Attorney's Office, where she prosecuted gang violence, sexual assault and murder cases over ten years.

Judicial career
While Chatman was a prosecutor, she was recruited by Judge Eugene Hyman to accept a position as a judge.  Chatman eventually became Gov. Gray Davis' first superior court appointment in Santa Clara County in 2000.  During here tenure as judge, she has supervised the Superior Court's three dedicated domestic violence courts where she helped to develop many changes, including a specialized court for mentally ill domestic violence defendants and a special project for defendants with children.  She presided over numerous sexual assault and murder trials and is currently assigned to the Family Law Division.
 
Chatman served on the national faculty for the National Judicial Institute on Domestic Violence and National Institute on Fatherhood, Visitation and Domestic Violence.  She made frequent presentations and appearances at schools and community groups, and was the inspiration for the 2005 founding Building Peaceful Families (BPF), a nonprofit entity whose mission is to foster the health and safety of children through better parenting.

Chatman presided over the trial of Robert Roy Farmer, who pled guilty to killing 21 cats and sexually abusing a dead cat. The high-profile trial went from 2015 to 2017; Chatman sentenced Farmer to 16 years in jail.

Chatman retired from the bench in early 2020. She died at home on December 22, 2020 due to complications from a brain tumor.

Awards and honors
She was the recipient of numerous community service awards, including the Santa Clara County Bar Association's Unsung Hero Award; the NAACP Social Justice Award; the Commission on the Status of Women - Woman of Vision Award; the California Judges Association – Alba Witkins Humanitarian Award for outstanding service to the community; 10 Most Influential African Americans in the Bay Area; and California Probation Officers Chief's Association Judicial Officer of the Year.

Head coaching record

See also 
 List of African-American jurists

References

External links 

1947 births
2020 deaths
Superior court judges in the United States
African-American judges
21st-century American judges
California state court judges
University of California, Hastings College of the Law alumni
California Polytechnic State University alumni
American women's basketball coaches
Basketball coaches from California
Basketball players from Bakersfield, California
Junior college women's basketball coaches in the United States
San Jose State Spartans women's basketball coaches
American women's basketball players
Point guards
21st-century American women judges
High school basketball coaches in California
Cal Poly Mustangs women's basketball coaches
Schoolteachers from California
Bakersfield College alumni
21st-century African-American women
21st-century African-American people
20th-century African-American women
20th-century African-American people
Deaths from brain cancer in the United States